Gabrielle Carle (born October 12, 1998) is a Canadian professional soccer player who plays as a defender or midfielder for National Women's Soccer League club Washington Spirit and the Canadian national team.

Early life
She began playing soccer when she was five years old with AS Chaudière-Est in Lévis. She attended the École secondaire des Sources in Montreal in the sport-study program.

In 2015, she was named the best Junior player in the province of Quebec and the best Senior player in Quebec in 2016.

College career 
In 2017, she committed to Florida State University, where she would play for the women's soccer team. She scored her first goal in the 86th minute against Ole Miss on November 10 in the first round of the 2017 NCAA Women's Soccer Championship. In 2018, she helped FSU to win the 2018 NCAA Division I Championship.

Club career
In 2015, she played with Quebec Dynamo ARSQ in the USL W-League. In 2018, she re-joined Dynamo de Quebec, now in the semi-professional PLSQ.

In December 2021, Carle joined Swedish club Kristianstads on an initial one-year contract beginning in 2022.

In December 2022, she joined the Washington Spirit of the National Women's Soccer League on a two-year contract with an option for 2025.

International career

Youth 
In 2013, at age 14, she was invited to a training camp for the Canada U17 team. The following year, she played for the Canada U20 team at the 2014 FIFA U-20 Women's World Cup, playing in all four of Canada's games. In 2015, Carle was named to the roster for the Pan American Games, where she featured in all five games for her country, with the team finishing in fourth place.

Senior 
She debuted for the senior team on December 9, 2015, against Mexico. She scored her first goal for Canada in a 10–0 win against Guatemala in the 2016 CONCACAF Women's Olympic Qualifying Championship.

She played every minute at the 2016 FIFA U-20 Women's World Cup, scoring against Nigeria. She was named as an alternate player for Canada at the 2016 Olympics, where the team won a bronze medal.

In 2018, Carle captained the U20 side at the 2018 CONCACAF Women's U-20 Championship, scoring twice during the group stage, and also against Mexico in the semi-finals, where Canada fell in a penalty shootout.

On May 25, 2019, she was named to the roster for the 2019 FIFA Women's World Cup. In 2021, she was named as an alternate for Canada for the delayed 2020 Olympics.

Honours 
Florida State Seminoles
 NCAA Division I Women's Soccer Championship: 2018, 2021
 ACC Women's Soccer Tournament: 2018, 2020, 2021
 ACC Women's Regular Season Champions: 2020

Canada
 Summer Olympics: 2021

Individual
 All-ACC Second Team: 2021
College Cup All-Tournament Team: 2018

References

External links 

 

  

1998 births
Living people
Canadian women's soccer players
Canada women's international soccer players
Women's association football forwards
Footballers at the 2015 Pan American Games
Sportspeople from Quebec City
Soccer people from Quebec
Florida State Seminoles women's soccer players
2019 FIFA Women's World Cup players
Pan American Games competitors for Canada
Olympic soccer players of Canada
Footballers at the 2020 Summer Olympics
Olympic medalists in football
Medalists at the 2020 Summer Olympics
Olympic gold medalists for Canada
Dynamo de Quebec players
Washington Spirit players